Jason Warren Lillis (born 1 October 1969, in Chatham, Kent) is an English former professional footballer who played as a striker. His clubs as a player included Gillingham, Maidstone United. and Walsall. He later managed Maidstone United and was then assistant manager of Whitstable Town. He also had spells as manager of Lordswood, and as a coach at Folkestone Invicta and Gillingham.

References

1969 births
Living people
Sportspeople from Chatham, Kent
Footballers from Kent
English footballers
Association football forwards
English Football League players
Gillingham F.C. players
FF Jaro players
Queens Park Rangers F.C. players
Maidstone United F.C. (1897) players
Carlisle United F.C. players
Sittingbourne F.C. players
Walsall F.C. players
Cambridge United F.C. players
Dover Athletic F.C. players
English football managers
Maidstone United F.C. managers
Herne Bay F.C. managers
Lordswood F.C. managers
Gillingham F.C. non-playing staff
English expatriate footballers
English expatriate sportspeople in Finland
Expatriate footballers in Finland